Andria "Antri" Christoforou (born 2 April 1992) is a Cypriot professional racing cyclist, who currently rides for UCI Women's Continental Team . In 2016, she became the National Champion for Cyprus in both the road race and individual time trial. She was selected to represent Cyprus at the 2016 Summer Olympics. She qualified to represent Cyprus at the 2020 Summer Olympics in the women's road race.

Major results

2010
 1st  Road race, National Road Championships
2013
 National Road Championships
1st  Road race
1st  Time trial 
 3rd Time Trial, Games of the Small States of Europe
2014 
 1st Sfendami Mountainbike race
 2nd Lakatamia Mountainbike race
2016 

 National Road Championships
1st  Road race
1st  Time trial 
 1st Arad Dimona Arad
 1st Dead Sea–Scorpion Pass
 3rd Massada Arad
2017 
 1st  Road race, National Road Championships
 Games of the Small States of Europe 
 1st Time trial
 2nd Cross-country
2018
 National Road Championships
1st  Road race
1st  Time trial  
 1st VR Women ITT
 3rd Time trial, Mediterranean Games
 6th Overall Tour of Eftalia Hotels & Velo Alanya
 6th Time Trial, Commonwealth Games
2019
 National Road Championships
1st  Road race
1st  Time trial 
1st Scorpions' Pass Time Trial
7th Chrono Gatineau
8th Grand Prix Cycliste de Gatineau
2020
 National Road Championships
1st  Road race
1st  Time trial 
2021
 National Road Championships
1st  Road race
1st  Time trial 
2022
 1st La Classique Morbihan
 4th Mediterranean Games Time trial
 6th Overall Vuelta Ciclista Andalucia Ruta Del Sol
 8th Navarra Women's Elite Classics
2023
 1st Aphrodite Cycling Race ITT
 1st Aphrodite Cycling Race - Women for future

References

External links
 

1992 births
Living people
Cypriot female cyclists
Cyclists at the 2016 Summer Olympics
Cyclists at the 2020 Summer Olympics
Olympic cyclists of Cyprus
Cyclists at the 2010 Summer Youth Olympics
Commonwealth Games competitors for Cyprus
Cyclists at the 2014 Commonwealth Games
Cyclists at the 2018 Commonwealth Games
Mediterranean Games bronze medalists for Cyprus
Competitors at the 2018 Mediterranean Games
Mediterranean Games medalists in cycling
European Games competitors for Cyprus
Cyclists at the 2019 European Games
People from Nicosia District
21st-century Cypriot women